Roger Marcel Lemelin (born February 6, 1954) is a Canadian former professional ice hockey defenceman who played 36 games in the National Hockey League for the Kansas City Scouts and the Colorado Rockies between 1974 and 1978. The rest of his career was spent in the minor leagues, mainly the American Hockey League (AHL), and he retired in 1984. After two seasons playing junior for the London Knights of the Ontario Hockey Association, Lemelin was selected by the Scouts in the 1974 NHL amateur draft, and by the Toronto Toros of the World Hockey Association in the 1974 WHA Amateur Draft. Opting to sign with the Scouts, Lemelin made his professional debut that year, though primarily played in the AHL. Over the next four seasons he would mainly stay in the AHL, while briefly appearing for the Scouts and later Rockies, as the Scouts had moved in 1976 to Colorado. After 1978 Lemelin played a further three seasons in the minor leagues, and after two seasons away played one final season in 1983–84.

Career statistics

Regular season and playoffs

External links
 

1954 births
Living people
Baltimore Clippers players
Canadian ice hockey defencemen
Colorado Rockies (NHL) players
Hampton Aces players
Hampton Gulls (AHL) players
Hershey Bears players
Ice hockey people from Ontario
Kansas City Scouts draft picks
Kansas City Scouts players
London Knights players
Muskegon Mohawks players
Oklahoma City Stars players
People from Iroquois Falls, Ontario
Philadelphia Firebirds (AHL) players
Phoenix Roadrunners (CHL) players
Rhode Island Reds players
Springfield Indians players
Toronto Toros draft picks